A Pilgrim or Puritan is a sandwich which has connotations with the American Pilgrim Fathers and Thanksgiving Day. It was a traditional way of using up leftover food from Thanksgiving Day and thus is composed essentially of bread slices or a bap, into which are placed sliced roast turkey, cranberries or cranberry sauce and cheddar cheese. There is an enormous variation in its composition with a huge range of ingredients being employed in some sandwiches and a great variation of ingredients between recipes. At its most basic it can be two slices of bread with slices of turkey, herb stuffing, cranberry sauce and some gravy.

More sophisticated versions of the Pilgrim sandwich include store-bought corn muffins, crusty hoagie, French bread, ciabatta rolls, extra virgin olive oil, butter, chopped apple, chopped onion, celery, flat leaf parsley, Thousand Island dressing and sliced/chopped pickled gherkins for topping.

A poll in Esquire, a well known international magazine, reported it to be one of America's favourite sandwiches, the version illustrated included Muenster cheese and lettuce in addition to turkey, stuffing and cranberry chutney.

See also

 List of American sandwiches

References

American sandwiches
New England cuisine
Turkey dishes